African century is the belief or hope that the 21st century will bring peace, prosperity and cultural revival to Africa. Among those who have spoken of an African century are South African politicians Thabo Mbeki and Nkosazana Dlamini-Zuma, Chevron CEO David J. O'Reilly, US Treasury Secretary Paul O'Neill and celebrity campaigner Bono. It has also inspired a radical policy journal - African Century Journal founded in 1999.

See also

Africanisation
Africanfuturism
African Renaissance
Afrofuturism
American Century
Asian Century
Millennium Development Goals

References

21st century
Pan-Africanism
21st century in Africa